Mehar Posh is a 2020 Pakistani romantic drama serial that aired from 3 April 2020 to 8 January 2021 on Geo Entertainment. It is produced by Abdullah Kadwani and Asad Qureshi under 7th Sky Entertainment. It stars Ayeza Khan and Danish Taimoor in their seventh project together. The supporting cast include Ali Abbas, Sania Saeed, Rehan Sheikh, Ismat Zaidi and Iffat Rahim. Despite a typical love story, its first episode was regarded as the highest rated first episode of any Pakistani series.

It is digitally available to stream on YouTube and in some countries on VIU App. The Show was also aired on Star Plus UAE.

Synopsis

Mehru is a simple and kind-hearted girl from a middle-class family. Shahjahan is Mehru's next-door neighbor who has always been respectful of Mehru and her family. In an unfortunate turn of events, on Mehru's wedding day, Shahjahan and his friends casually pass flirtatious remarks for Mehru and joke around. Her husband, Naeem, hears their conversation about Mehru and threatens to divorce her because of the malicious intentions of her in-laws. Naeem's aunt, Shakeela, has always been jealous of Naeem's mother, Sakeena, and her family. She tricks Naeem into thinking that Mehru reciprocates feelings for the group of friends. Naeem, furious over what he had heard and guided by the cruel motives of his aunt, divorces Mehru on the first night of their marriage (the wedding night). Mehru tries to tell Naeem that she does not know what he is talking about, nor has she ever had feelings for anyone. Naeem refuses to listen to her and insults her character. Naeem's mother blames him for listening to his aunt and tells him that Mehru is an innocent girl. However, Naeem does not listen and tells his mother to drop Mehru off at her home. The next morning, Naeem's mother apologizes to Mehru and drops her off. Mehru reveals her divorce to her family which leaves them heartbroken. Due to which, Mehru and Ayat's father dies. Shahjahan also learns of Mehru's divorce and learns that Naeem had listened to the flirtatious comments that he and his friends had jokingly passed for her.

Shahjahan feels guilty and blames himself for Mehru's condition. He begins to develop feelings for her. Eventually, Mehru reciprocates the feeling for him unaware that Ayat (Mehru's sister) also has feelings for Shahjahan. When Ayat learns about Mehru and Shahjahan, she blackmails Mehru that she will kill herself if she doesn't get Shahjahan. After which Mehru is heartbroken. Due to this she tells Shahjahan to marry Ayat who himself is confused. He tries his best to convince her but he fails. He then being under pressure because of his mom and Mehru marries Ayat. After a few months Mehru gets to know that Shahjahan and his friends were the people responsible for her marriage to break after which she breaks all ties with Shahjahan and decides to move on and marry Rashid (Mehru's boss). Ayat, who was waiting for an opportunity takes this situation as an advantage and tries to convince Shahjahan into believing that Mehru was always after money and she used him but he doesn't believe her. Then, Ayat mixes poison in food she has made for Mehru, when Shahjahan see the bottle of poison under chair he runs to Mehru's house and tell Mehru that Ayat has mixed poison in food. But Nusrat does not believe that her daughter can mix poison so she decides to eat that food, but Ayat stops her and says that Shahjahan is saying Truth. Then Shahjahan gets a call and gets know about Ayat's accident. So, everybody came to hospital then Ayat asks Shahjahan to promise to always care for Mehru. After Ayat's death Mehru is depressed. At, Mehru wedding Rashid tells Mehru to marry Shahjahan. Then, Mehru agreed and says Shahjahan that "Pehle toh tum bade pagal ho rehe the mujhse shaadi karne ke liye aur ab maine haan kardi hai toh nakhre dikha rahe ho".

Cast 
Ayeza Khan as Mehrunnisa aka Mehru
Danish Taimoor as Shah Jahan
Ali Abbas as Naeem
Zainab Shabir as Ayat; Mehru's sister (dead)
Sania Saeed as Nusrat; Mehru's mother
Rehan Sheikh as Jahanzaib; Mehru's father (dead)
Ismat Zaidi as Sakeena; Naeem's mother
Iffat Rahim as Shakeela; Naeem's aunt
Humaira Bano as Kaneez; Shah Jahan's mother
Arez Ahmed as Waqas
Beena Chaudhary as Mehru's aunt
Mubsirah Khan as Almas
Ayesha Gul as Aisha
Seemi Pasha as herself
Affan Waheed as Rashid (Mehru's boss)

Production 
On 12 March 2020, Khan revealed through Instagram about her upcoming project. The first teaser was released in March 2020. The fourth teaser revealed that the serial would release on 3 April 2020.

It is the seventh project featuring real life couple Khan and Taimoor together after Larkiyan Mohallay Ki (2010), Kitni Girhain Baaki hain (2012), Saari Bhool Hamari Thi (2013), Kahani Aik Raat Ki (2013), Shareek-e-Hayat (2014) and Jab We Wed (2014).

Soundtrack

The original soundtrack is sung and composed by Sahir Ali Bagga on his own lyrics.

Track listing

Awards and nominations

References

External links 
Official website
 

2020 Pakistani television series debuts
2021 Pakistani television series endings
Urdu-language television shows
Pakistani drama television series
Geo TV original programming